The Caroli Group is a Monegasque diversified company. It encompasses real estate development, communication and media. It is headquartered in Monaco.

History
The real estate company was founded by the engineer Antonio Caroli in 1978.

Real estate development
Since its founding in the 1970s, the company has built several residential buildings and luxury hotels in Monaco. 

In 1973, Caroli Group built Le Mirabeau. 

In 1975, it completed the building of Hôtel Loews, now known as the Fairmont Monte Carlo. 

It also built La Réserve de Beaulieu & Spa in Beaulieu-sur-Mer, just outside Monaco. It built the Monte Carlo Palace in 1988. It also built Soleil d'Or and Terrasses du Port, two residential buildings.

In 2015, the Caroli Group expanded the Antoine 1er dock by developing more buildings for 52 apartments and two museums for Euro 300 million.

Communication
Its subsidiary Promocom was founded in 1988. It is chaired by Francesco Caroli, Antonio Caroli's son, who serves as the Chairman of Sycom (syndicat patronal monégasque des professionnels de la communication). It includes advertising, Sécurité Privée Monaco (private security), digital advertising, and event planning.

Media
It publishes L'Observateur de Monaco, a monthly magazine, and Monaco Hebdo, a weekly newspaper.

References

Companies of Monaco